Another Late Night: Zero 7 is a DJ mix album, mixed by Zero 7. It is the fourth in the series from Late Night Tales. It was released on 18 February 2002 on Late Night Tales in the UK (catalogue no. ALNCD04) and on Kinetic Records in the USA (catalogue no. 67728-54705-2).

Track listing

Single
"Truth And Rights" (a mistitled cover of Johnny Osborne's "Truths & Rights") was released as a single to promote the album in 2002.

UK 7" single  ALN704
"Truth And Rights"
"Truth And Rights (Spoken Word Story)"

References

Zero 7
2002 compilation albums
Zero 7 compilation albums